Leon Sarteel (2 October 1882 – 2 May 1942) was a Belgian sculptor. His work was part of the sculpture event in the art competition at the 1928 Summer Olympics.

References

1882 births
1942 deaths
20th-century Belgian sculptors
Olympic competitors in art competitions
Artists from Ghent